Robert Gordon Williams (born 17 February 1940) is an English former professional footballer who played as an inside left. He made over 320 Football League appearances in the years after the Second World War.

Career
Williams played locally in Bristol. Peter Doherty signed Bobby Williams in May 1958 for Bristol City, with Williams joining his boyhood club. Williams moved from Bristol City to Rotherham United in February 1965 for £10,000. Williams joined Bristol Rovers in March 1967. Williams moved to Reading in August 1969.

Bobby Williams then had spells with AS Oostende in Belgium, with Cheltenham Town under the management of former Bristol City player Bobby Etheridge and with Weymouth in the Southern League.  Bobby Williams was almost killed in a car crash in September 1972 which despite a playing comeback attempt with local Bristol club Keynsham Town brought an end to his playing career. Williams then joined Reading as their youth teammanager.

Honours
with Bristol City
Football League Third Division runners up: 1964–65

References

1940 births
Footballers from Bristol
English footballers
Association football forwards
English Football League players
Southern Football League players
Reading F.C. players
Bristol City F.C. players
Rotherham United F.C. players
Bristol Rovers F.C. players
Cheltenham Town F.C. players
Weymouth F.C. players
Keynsham Town F.C. players
A.S.V. Oostende K.M. players
Living people